Bergel is a surname. Notable people with the surname include:

Erich Bergel (1930–1998), Romanian musician
Joseph Bergel (1802–1885), Hungarian physician and author
Erich Bergel  (1930–1998), Hungarian flutist and conductor
Bergel, Hungarian noble house